Brachystemma calycinum is a species of plant native to southwestern China. It is the only species in the genus Brachystemma

References

Caryophyllaceae
Monotypic Caryophyllaceae genera
Flora of China